The Sandals, also known as The Sandells, were an early, influential surf rock band formed in 1962. They are most famous for scoring the surfing documentary The Endless Summer.

History 

The Sandals began in 1962, when Danny Brawner, a drummer, joined a high-school group called The Twangs, headed up by the brothers Gaston and Walter Georis. The Twangs were a group heavily influenced by The Ventures. At this point, the core of The Sandals was formed: Brawner on drums, Gaston on keyboards, Walter on rhythm guitar, John Blakeley on lead guitar with his brother, David, on bass. David was replaced by John Gibson early on. The band changed their name to The Shadows, and eventually settled on The Sandells, a portmanteau of "Sand" and "ells", a popular ending for groups at the time. They released their first album, Scrambler!, in early 1964. They partnered with World Pacific Records for the release, which allowed them to come in contact with Bruce Brown, who was then just beginning editing work on his next documentary project, The Endless Summer.

Brawner and the Georis brothers met with Brown in Long Beach at a surf fair, hoping to sell him one of the Sandals songs for use on Brown's new film. Brown, however, was so impressed by their music that he agreed to use a number of their songs in the film. It was agreed that all film profit would go to Brown, and all soundtrack profit to go to The Sandells. The group used the studio time that working on the film gave them to release a number of LPs and Singles during this period. Jim King worked with the group at this time, producing a number of songs, including "Always" and "All Over Again", both of which received limited national radio airplay. The group also slightly modified their name during this time, to the surf-inspired "The Sandals". For a time, the group toured with the film, providing live backing for the live narration by Bruce Brown.

After The Endless Summer film reached nationwide distribution, The Sandals recorded the song "Endless Summer", one of their first songs with vocals. The song was a departure in a number of ways, and not just relating to the vocals. They were attempting a Beach Boys-esque sound, with mixed results. They also re-released the Scrambler! LP as The Endless Summer, along with new single records similarly retitled.

In 1967, Dick Barrymore hired The Sandals to score his skiing documentary, The Last of the Ski Bums. As on Scrambler!, John Blakeley's songwriting skills were at the forefront of the album — 10 of the 12 songs contained at least some of his input. However, this album also marked Danny's departure from the band after he refused to leave San Clemente, California, where the band had been based, for Riverside, California. He was replaced by Steve Ekwall, who played on the album.

Soon after the release of the Last of the Ski Bums album, the group broke up.

In 2011, Walter and Sylvia Georis established Cowgirl Winery with assistance from Damien Georis. Both of these wineries are in the Carmel Valley AVA wine region of California.

Danny Brawner worked for Hobie Surfboards as the factory manager and also doing finish work on boards like pinlines and color work.

John Blakeley remained involved in music, joining Stoneground in 1971.

There have been two reunions to date: in 1992, the Georis brothers and Blakeley reformed the band, and released a few albums, most notably working on The Endless Summer II. They also rerecorded (in 1992) the original album (that includes a few new songs) using some of the original instruments.  In 2002, the Georis', Blakeley, Gibson, and Brawner played at the Galaxy Theater in Santa Ana, California, to a packed house.

Discography

As The Sandells

LPs 
 1964 – Scrambler!

45s 
 1964 – "Scrambler"/"Out Front"
 1964 – "School's Out!"/"Wild as the Sea"
 1964 – "Theme from the Endless Summer"/"6-pak"

As The Sandals

LPs 
 1966 – The Endless Summer Soundtrack
 1969 – Last of the Ski Bums Soundtrack
 1992 – The Endless Summer Soundtrack (rerecorded, including a few new songs)
 1994 – The Spirit of Surf
 2001 – Silvertone
 2003 – Wild as the Sea: Complete Sandals 1964–1969 (Collection)

45s 
 1964 – "Always (I Will Remember)"/"All Over Again"
 1965 – "Endless Summer"/"Theme From The Endless Summer"
 1966 – "Theme from the Endless Summer"/"6-pak"
 1966 – "Tell Us Dylan"/"Why Should I Cry"
 1967 – "Cloudy"/"House of Painted Glass"
 1969 – "Winter Spell"/"Ski Bum"

Notes

References

Books

External links 
 The Sandals Official Site
 Tri-Surf Records – Sells The Sandals CDs and other surf rock bands.
 

Surf music groups